Deir Mar Musa al-Habashi ( deiro d-mor mūše kūšoyo; , ALA-LC: dayr mār Mūsá al-Ḥabashī), literally the Monastery of Saint Moses the Abyssinian, is a monastic community of the Syriac Catholic Church located near the town of Nabk, Syria, approximately  north of Damascus, on the eastern slopes of the Anti-Lebanon Mountains. The main church of the monastic compound hosts precious frescoes dating to the 11th and 12th century.

History 
An ancient building, stone circles, lines and tombs were recently discovered near the monastery in 2009 by archaeologist Robert Mason of the Royal Ontario Museum. Mason suggested that the ruins may date back 10,000 years and were likely constructed in Neolithic period (such as the Heavy Neolithic Qaraoun culture of the Anti-Lebanon).

The lack of evidence for a farming community before the 6th century suggests that the original structures for what is now the monastery were either state impositions or monastic/ecclesiastical foundations. The two oldest extant structures on the site were likely Roman watchtowers built to oversee the road from Palmyra to Damascus. The earliest manuscript and coinage attestations indicate that the monastery was likely founded in the sixth century, supported by the network of lavra in nearby rock-faces which seem to date from this period. The site was largely rebuilt in both the 11th and 16th centuries. Its 11th-12th century frescoes, dating from between 1058 and 1208, represent ‘the only full program of mediaeval church decoration to have survived in greater Syria’ and provide important evidence of the growth of the medieval Syrian school of painting.

The larger ‘Roman’ tower seems to have been reconstructed in the 12th century, with well-dressed, well-lain stonework and vaulting on the ground floor, suggesting the involvement of professional engineers and masons, likely in response to a series of earthquakes in 1138 and again in 1157. The tower also yields pottery almost exclusively from the 14th century, including a piece of Yuan-dynasty Longquan celadon stoneware from China.

In 1838, the place, named Deir Mar Musa, was noted as having a Syriac population. The monastery was abandoned some time in the 19th century after intermittent activity from the 15th century onwards, but was refounded in 1992 when Paolo Dall'Oglio, with deacon Jacques Mourad (now Archbishop of Homs), “officially” founded under the authority of the Syriac Catholic Church a double monastic community (men and women, which is normally contrary to the XX canon of the Second Council of Nicaea), named "Al-Khalil Monastic Community of Deir Mar Musa al-Habashi", devoted to four tasks: prayer (in Arabic salat), work (amal), hospitality (dayafa) and dialogue (hiwar).

Gallery

See also
Monastery of Saint James the Mutilated (Qara)
Paolo Dall'Oglio

References

Bibliography

External links
 The official site of the al-Khalil monastic Community of Deir Mar Musa al-Habashi
 The Monastery of St Moses, Syria at the Royal Ontario Museum
 Pictures of Deir Mar Musa (scroll to bottom)
 Manar al-Athar photo archive

Megalithic monuments in the Middle East
Eastern Catholic monasteries in Syria
Syriac Catholic church buildings
Populated places established in the 6th century
6th-century establishments in Asia